This article lists described species of the family Asilidae start with letter J.

A
B
C
D
E
F
G
H
I
J
K
L
M
N
O
P
Q
R
S
T
U
V
W
Y
Z

List of Species

Genus Joartigasia
 Joartigasia anceps (Hermann, 1912)
 Joartigasia rubriventris (Hermann, 1912)
 Joartigasia ruficaudis (Hermann, 1912)

Genus Jothopogon
 Jothopogon leucomallus (Loew, 1871)
 Jothopogon niveicolor (Lehr, 1972)

Genus Juxtasilus
 Juxtasilus capensis (Londt, 1979)

References 

 
Asilidae